George Halford may refer to:

 George Halford (bishop) (1865–1948), Anglican bishop of Rockhampton
 George Halford (musician) (1858–1933), English pianist, organist, composer and conductor
 George Britton Halford (1824–1910), English-born anatomist and physiologist in Australia